The Nanggroe Aceh Party is a regional political party in Indonesia. It was established as National Aceh Party (Partai Nasional Aceh), as a result of a split within the Aceh Party triggered by disagreements over the candidate for governor in the 2012 Aceh gubernatorial election. The party qualified to contest the 2014 elections in Aceh, and won 4.7 percent of the vote, winning three seats in the provincial legislature.

In 2017, the party changed its initial name with the "N" now means Nanggroe (Acehnese for land) instead of Nasional.

Ballot number history
2014: 12
2019: 18

References

Political parties in Indonesia